Liberty is the ability to do as one pleases, or have the power and resources to fulfill one's purposes.

Liberty may also refer to:

Arts, entertainment, and literature

Films and television
 Liberty (serial), a 1916 film serial
 Liberty (1929 film), a short film starring Laurel and Hardy
 Liberty (1986 film), a television historical drama
 Liberty!, a 1997 documentary about the American Revolutionary War

Magazines and newspapers
 Liberty (1881–1908), an anarchist political magazine
 Liberty (Adventist magazine), a religious liberty magazine
 Liberty (British newspaper), an anarcho-communist paper published from 1894 to 1896
 Liberty (general interest magazine), a magazine published from 1924 to 1950
 Liberty (libertarian magazine), a political magazine published from 1987
 Liberty (newspaper), a defunct English-language newspaper published in Thailand
 Liberties, an American literary magazine edited by Leon Wieseltier

Others
 Liberty (manga), a 2017 manga by Izumi Kitta
 "Liberty" (poem), a 1942 poem by Paul Éluard
 "Liberty", a 1730 poem by James Thomson
 Liberty! The Saga of Sycamore Shoals, an outdoor play performed seasonally in Tennessee, US
 Liberty Liberty!, a 2005 Japanese manga
 Liberty style, the Italian variant of Art Nouveau
 Liberty/Libertà, a 2019 exhibition by the sculptor Martin Puryear at the Venice Biennale's American pavilion
 On Liberty, an 1859 political philosophy paper written by John Stuart Mill

Business
 Liberty (department store), a London store founded in 1875 by Arthur Lasenby Liberty
 The Liberty, a shopping centre in Havering, London
 Liberty Aerospace, a manufacturer of general aviation aircraft
 Liberty Alliance, a standards consortium for identity management
 Liberty Broadcasting System, a defunct radio network
 Liberty Corporation, a defunct insurance and media company, based in South Carolina, USA
 Liberty Global, a media company and broadband provider
 Liberty Holdings Limited, a financial services company in South Africa
 Liberty Media, holding company for the media interests of John C. Malone
 Liberty Medical, a company that sells diabetes testers
 Liberty Mutual, a large United States insurance company
 Liberty Oil, Australian petrol retailer
 Liberty Reserve, a former digital currency service
 Liberty Safe, a safe manufacturer located in the United States founded in 1988
 Liberty Shoes, a shoe company based in India, est. 1954

Music
 Liberty! (album), a 1997 album by Mark O'Connor
 Liberty (Duran Duran album), 1990
 Liberty (Lindi Ortega album), 2018
 Liberty (Miliyah Kato album), 2016
 Liberty Music Shop Records, a record label
 Liberty Records, a former US record label
 Liberty X (formerly Liberty), a pop group founded on British reality show, Popstars
 Liberty, a 1995 album by The Guess Who
 "Liberty", a song by Janis Ian from Present Company
 "Liberty", a song by Heavenly from Virus
 "Liberty", a song by John 5 from Vertigo
 "Liberty", a song by Vertical Horizon from There and Back Again
 "Liberty", a song by the Grateful Dead from So Many Roads (1965–1995) and Road Trips Volume 2 Number 4
 "Liberty", a song by Journey from Time3

People
 Arthur Lasenby Liberty (1843–1917), founder of Liberty & Co
 Liberty DeVitto (born 1950), an American rock drummer
 Liberty Hyde Bailey, American botanist
 Liberty Ross (born 1978), an English model and actress
 Liberty Van Zandt, a character from the Canadian television drama Degrassi: The Next Generation
 Liberty, one half of the professional wrestling tag-team The American Eagles
 Liberty, a female professional wrestler from the Gorgeous Ladies of Wrestling
 Liberty Valance, title character of the film The Man Who Shot Liberty Valance

Places
 The Liberties, Dublin, a district in the south-west inner city of Dublin, Ireland
 Liberty, Saskatchewan, Canada

United States
 Liberty City (disambiguation)
 Liberty County (disambiguation)
 Liberty Township (disambiguation)
 Liberty, Arizona
 Liberty, California, a community in Sonoma County
 Liberty, San Joaquin County, California, a ghost town
 Liberty, Idaho
 Liberty, Illinois
 Liberty, Saline County, Illinois
 Liberty, Indiana
 Liberty, Kansas
 Liberty, Kentucky
 Garden Village, Kentucky or Liberty, a community in Pike County
 Liberty, Louisiana
 Liberty, Maine
 Liberty, Mississippi
 Liberty, Missouri
 Liberty, Nebraska
 Liberty (town), New York, a town in Sullivan County, New York
 Liberty (village), New York, a village in Sullivan County, New York
 Liberty, North Carolina
 Liberty, Ohio
 Liberty, Oklahoma
 Liberty, Pennsylvania (disambiguation), three places
 Liberty Mountain Resort, a ski area located in Carroll Valley, Pennsylvania
 Liberty, South Carolina
 Liberty, Tennessee
 Liberty, Texas
 Liberty, Utah
 Tridell, Utah, also called Liberty
 Liberty, Washington
 Liberty, Yakima County, Washington
 Liberty, West Virginia
 Liberty, Wisconsin (disambiguation), five places
 West Liberty (disambiguation)

Transportation

Water transport
 Liberty ship, a design of cargo ship mass-produced in the United States during World War II
 Liberty (ship), a list of ships named Liberty
 Liberty pass, for shore leave
 HMS Liberty (J391), a World War II minesweeper

Aviation
 Liberty (rocket), a proposed rocket for crew and cargo
 Airco DH.4, at one point called "Liberty Planes"
 Associated Air Liberty 181, an American aircraft design
 Rolls-Royce AE 1107C-Liberty aeroengine

Land transport
 Avelia Liberty, a high-speed train built by Alstom for the North American market 
 Liberty Motor Car, an American car manufacturer from 1916 to 1923
 Liberty truck, a former United States cargo vehicle
 Jeep Liberty, an SUV
 Liberty L-12, a United States First World War V12 aero-engine also used in 1930s British tanks as the Nuffield Liberty
 Tank Mark VIII, the Mark VIII or "Liberty", an Anglo-American development of the main British tank of the First World War

Other uses
 "Liberty," a term used for shore leave in the United States Coast Guard, United States Marine Corps, and United States Navy
 Liberty (advocacy group), a United Kingdom pressure group that campaigns to protect civil liberties and human rights
 Liberty (apple), a hybrid apple cultivar
 Liberty (cucumber), used for pickling
 Liberty (division), a largely medieval English administrative unit
 Liberty (dog) (1974–1984), golden retriever pet of Gerald Ford
 "Liberty" (Fringe), an episode of the television series Fringe
 Liberty (Go), an empty space adjacent to a group of stones in the board game Go
 Liberty (Muni), a station on the San Francisco Municipal Railway
 Liberty (personification), the anthropomorphic portrayal of the concept of liberty, often as a goddess
 Liberty Bell
 Liberty University, a Christian research university in Lynchburg, Virginia
 Liberty Flames and Lady Flames, the university's athletic program
 New York Liberty, a women's basketball team
 Statue of Liberty, an 1886 colossal neoclassical sculpture on Liberty Island in the middle of New York Harbor, in Manhattan, New York City
 Liberty, a cheerleading stunt

See also

 Liberty Party (disambiguation)
 Liberty Stadium (disambiguation)
 Liberty Tree (disambiguation)
 Goddess of Liberty (disambiguation)
 Lady Liberty (disambiguation)
 Mount Liberty (disambiguation)
 Liberta (disambiguation)
 Libertas (disambiguation)
 Liberté (disambiguation)
 Libertyville, Illinois